3-Methylcrotonyl-CoA or β-Methylcrotonyl-CoA is an intermediate in the metabolism of leucine.

It is found in mitochondria, where it is formed from isovaleryl-coenzyme A by isovaleryl coenzyme A dehydrogenase. It then reacts with CO2 to yield 3-Methylcrotonyl-CoA carboxylase.

Leucine metabolism

See also 
 Methylcrotonyl-CoA carboxylase

References 

Thioesters of coenzyme A